USS Hiawatha (YT-265), later YTB-265, later YTM-265, was a type V2-ME-A1 harbor tug that entered service in the United States Navy in 1942, and was sold in 1987. She was the third ship to bear the name Hiawatha.

Construction
Hiawatha was laid down as the tug Port Angeles, under a Maritime Commission (MARCOM) contract, MC hull 432, by Birchfield Boiler, Inc. at Tacoma, Washington, on 27 October 1941. She was launched on 3 April 1942, sponsored by Mrs. Violet Davies. The U.S. Navy acquired Port Angeles on 30 April 1942, renaming her Hiawatha, and placed her in service as harbor tug Hiawatha (YT-265).

Service history
Because of a delay in the delivery of the engine, the supercharger was not installed and delivery was delayed until 30 November 1942. Hiawatha performed harbor tug duties for the 13th Naval District, at Seattle, Washington, during and after World War II. She was reclassified as a large harbor tug, and redesignated YTB-265, on 15 May 1944.

In 1948, Hiawatha was assigned to the 12th Naval District, where she operated as a tug for the San Francisco Naval Shipyard, at San Francisco, California, into at least the 1960s. She was reclassified as a medium harbor tug, and redesignated YTM-265, in February 1962.

Hiawatha was sold for scrapping on 7 April 1987.

References

Bibliography

External links

Tugs of the United States Navy
World War II auxiliary ships of the United States
Ships built in Tacoma, Washington
1942 ships